The Texas Trail Stone Corral, near Imperial, Nebraska, was built in 1874 and is a rare surviving artifact of cattle drives along the Texas Trail.  It is listed on the National Register of Historic Places and as a Nebraska historic resource, NeHBS no. CH00-041.

The site has two surviving walls of a  dry stone corral.  It is on a property that was once a 640-acre ranch property.  Two other walls were removed in 1940 for the stones to be used in a different wall.

It was listed on the National Register of Historic Places in 2002.

References

External links 
More photos of the Texas Trail Stone Corral at Wikimedia Commons

Agricultural buildings and structures on the National Register of Historic Places in Nebraska
Buildings and structures completed in 1876
Buildings and structures in Chase County, Nebraska
Corrals
National Register of Historic Places in Chase County, Nebraska